The 1979 Rhode Island Rams football team was an American football team that represented the University of Rhode Island in the Yankee Conference during the 1979 NCAA Division I-AA football season. In their fourth season under head coach Bob Griffin, the Rams compiled a 1–9–1 record (1–4 against conference opponents) and finished in fifth place in the conference.

Schedule

References

Rhode Island
Rhode Island Rams football seasons
1979 in sports in Rhode Island